Under the Cherry Moon is a 1986 romantic musical comedy-drama film starring Prince and marking his directorial debut. The film also stars former The Time member Jerome Benton, Steven Berkoff, Kristin Scott Thomas (in her feature film debut), and Francesca Annis. Though the film underperformed both critically and commercially, winning five Golden Raspberry Awards and tying with Howard the Duck for Worst Picture, the soundtrack album, Parade, sold over a million copies and achieved platinum status.

Plot
Christopher Tracy and his friend Tricky are gigolos, originally from Miami, who live on the French Riviera. Christopher works as a piano player at the Venus de Milo nightclub in Nice and, along with Tricky, spends his days identifying rich women to target in order to gain large amounts of money via marriage. At the beginning of the film, Christopher is in an informal relationship with wealthy divorced spinster Mrs. Wellington, while Tricky is romantically involved with their landlady, Katy, who is threatening to toss them out onto the streets unless they pay two months of back rent.

One day, while reading the front page of the local newspaper, Tricky notices that Mary Sharon is due to have her 21st birthday and thus inherit a $50 million trust fund established by her father Isaac, a shipping magnate. Deciding that Mary will make a suitable next target, they both gatecrash the party, held at the Sharon Estate. Christopher catches Mary's attention, but quickly learns that her father has arranged for her to be engaged to Jonathan, an employee of his, to consolidate the fortunes of two powerful families.

Mary rejects Christopher at the party and bouncers throw both him and Tricky out. She visits Christopher the following day at the nightclub where he works and delivers a message from Mrs. Wellington to visit her house later that evening. Christopher visits Mrs. Wellington, but realizes that the arrangement is a setup, as she is having an affair with Mary's father.

Christopher and Tricky meet with Mary at an exclusive restaurant, where both of them mock her privileged upbringing and lack of street sensibility. Christopher performs "Girls & Boys", but the song is interrupted when Isaac, alerted to Mary's presence by a maître d', takes her home. Humiliated at how her father still controls her life, Mary vows to become her own woman. Both Christopher and Tricky start to genuinely fall in love with Mary, but realize that if they continue to pursue her, her father, who has been using his bodyguards to trace them, will deal with them severely. They try to sneak into Mary's bedroom late one night, but accidentally disturb her mother Muriel instead before running off.

When Christopher fails to show for a meeting with Tricky, due to meeting Mary at a nearby racecourse, Tricky gets drunk and reveals to Mary their scam in order to get her money. Hurt by the revelation, she confronts her mother about the hypocrisy on which she was raised, and they decide to immediately leave France to visit Jonathan in New York. Mrs. Wellington meets Christopher and tells him that Isaac will pay him $100,000 to stay away from his daughter; an incensed Christopher writes a classic obscenity on it, hands it back and is ready to leave when she tells him Mary is leaving at midnight on the family plane for New York. As he pulls off, she wishes him good luck. He wins Mary back at the airport after the two passionately argue with each other.

Isaac, now aware that Mary is in love with Christopher, alerts the Chief of Police and harbor patrol and orders them to locate both his daughter and her lover immediately. The harbor patrol quickly locates them, and a marksman on the boat is told to shoot Christopher. Mary pleads with Christopher to run away, but he gets off the boat onto the dock, saying he will not go without her, and the marksman fatally shoots him. As a distraught Tricky falls to his knees in prayer, Mary goes to the dock and cradles Christopher, who dies happily in her arms whilst Isaac, Tricky and Katy look on. When Isaac arrives to take Mary home, she says she is going with Christopher and accompanies the patrol boat, leaving Isaac alone on the dock.

In the film's epilogue, it is revealed that Tricky has moved back to Miami with Katy and is now in charge of his own apartment complex, which has been bought for him by Mary, now his investor. In a letter to Tricky delivered by Katy, Mary reveals that she is moving on with her life, but will never forget Christopher as long as she lives.

Cast
 Prince as Christopher Tracy
 Jerome Benton as Tricky
 Kristin Scott Thomas as Mary Sharon
 Steven Berkoff as Isaac Sharon, Mary's father and a billionaire shipping magnate
 Emmanuelle Sallet as Katy
 Alexandra Stewart as Mrs. Muriel Sharon, Mary's mother
 Francesca Annis as Mrs. Wellington
 Victor Spinetti, Myriam Tadesse, and Moune De Vivier as The Jaded Three

Production
Following the huge success of Purple Rain and Prince becoming one of the biggest stars in the world, the musician had pretty much carte-blanche when developing ideas for a new film and the studio green-lit the project without even having seen a script, expecting another success like its predecessor. With no experience as scriptwriter, Becky Johnson from New York was assigned to develop a screenplay. Despite her lack of experience Prince and the studio were willing to take a leap of faith based upon a test screenplay she wrote.

Prince wanted the film to be a romantic comedy with a 1930s vibe set in an exotic location like Palm Beach, Miami or Capri. The idea was then born to shoot the film in France and in mid-June 1985 Prince together with his manager Steve Fargnoli and tour manager Alan Leeds flew to France to scout locations and meet with potential cast. After visiting the French Riviera, Prince decided he wanted to shoot the film there. Scenes used in the movie were filmed at Les Salons De La Rotonde in Beaulieu-sur-Mer.

Prince wanted Jean-Baptiste Mondino to direct, but when he was unavailable, video director Mary Lambert was recruited. German cinematographer Michael Ballhaus was hired as director of photography.

Filming started at the Victorine Studios in Nice, France on September 14, 1985, directed by Mary Lambert, the director behind some of Madonna's and Janet Jackson's most popular music videos, but after disagreements about the film's direction, she left the production on November 4 after 16 days of filming and Prince took over directing himself. Lambert is listed as a creative consultant in the film's credits. Prince was able to take over the production as it was being filmed in Europe and thus did not fall afoul of the Directors Guild of America who veto directors being fired in favor of lead performers taking over their duties.

The cast was also changed during pre-production. Prince originally had planned to have Susannah Melvoin (sister of Revolution member Wendy Melvoin, as well as Prince's girlfriend at the time) play Mary Sharon, but it was clear she couldn't act and Prince replaced her with Kristin Scott Thomas (in her feature debut).

The film was conceived by Prince as being filmed in black and white, but Warner Brothers had concerns that this would reduce its commercial appeal, so a deal was struck where the film would be shot on color stock but processed into black and white in post-production. None of the color footage has yet emerged with the exception of the music videos for Mountains which is the same as the end credits sequence in the picture but kept in its original colored format.

Soundtrack

Under the Cherry Moon, along with its soundtrack album, marked the first of many recorded collaborations between Prince and jazz keyboardist/composer-arranger Clare Fischer, whose orchestral arrangements had by this time become highly demanded by pop and R&B acts, stemming from his initial arrangements for Rufus and Chaka Khan in the early 1970s. Appearing in the credits as "Orchestra Composed and Arranged by...," Fischer's contribution was further acknowledged by Prince in both the film's closing titles and the album's liner notes: 

The film also includes several pieces of music that were not on the Parade album. The opening introduction scene features a piano accompaniment (later credited as "An Honest Man" although it is not related to the acapella track of the same name included on the Crystal Ball compilation). The scene where Mary and Christopher dance on the restaurant balcony was accompanied by "Alexa De Paris", later featured as a B-Side on the 1986 release of Mountains and 1993 single Letitgo. The single release of Kiss includes "Love or Money" which is featured later in the film as Tricky and Christopher go on a shopping spree with Mary. Excerpts from the opening of Jill Jones' single Mia Bocca are included during the scenes at Mary's birthday party. The song Old Friends 4 Sale is featured near the end of the movie and would later lend its name to an outtakes album released in 1999 which also featured it in a more orchestrated version than the original (The Vault: Old Friends 4 Sale)

Reception

Box office
Under the Cherry Moon failed to gain any breakout audience, regardless of much pre-publicity including a special MTV premiere in Sheridan, Wyoming. It was held there after a fan won a contest to have the film shown in her hometown. The film earned $3,150,924 in its opening weekend from 976 venues, ranking #11 at the domestic box office (according to the Daily Variety Chart), and the fourth-highest among the weekend's new releases. At the end of its run, the film's final domestic gross was $10,090,429.

Critical response
The film received generally negative reviews from critics. On Rotten Tomatoes, it currently holds a 36% score based on 36 reviews, with an average rating of 3.86/10. The site's consensus states: "Under the Cherry Moon may satisfy the most rabid Prince fans, but everyone else will be better served with this vanity project's far superior soundtrack."

Siskel & Ebert gave them film "Two Thumbs Down" on their review show, later including it on their Worst of 1986 list. Ebert commented on the Worst of 1986 show that "the film achieves a nice glossy black and white look and then never figures out what to do with it".

In 2016, Peter Sobczynski, writing for Roger Ebert's website, reappraised Under the Cherry Moon, calling it a better film than Purple Rain, and stating that the film's contemporaneous negative reception had been due to people expecting it to resemble Purple Rain.

Home media
Under the Cherry Moon was first released on DVD on February 8, 2005. The film was released on Blu-ray for the first time on October 4, 2016, separately in a purple case and as part of the Prince Movie Collection.

Accolades

Notes

References

External links
 
 
 

1986 films
1980s English-language films
1980s musical films
1986 romantic drama films
American black-and-white films
American musical comedy-drama films
American romantic comedy-drama films
American romantic musical films
Films about interracial romance
Films directed by Prince (musician)
Films set in France
Films shot in France
Films with screenplays by Becky Johnston
1986 directorial debut films
Golden Raspberry Award winning films
1980s American films